"The Mezzotint" is a ghost story by British writer M. R. James, included in his first collection Ghost Stories of an Antiquary (1904).

Plot summary 
Mr. Williams, the curator of a university art museum (implied to be Oxford), receives a mezzotint from an art dealer. The very disturbing engraving changes each time Mr. Williams and the colleagues he enlists look at it. In the end, it is suggested that the nighttime engraving depicts a vengeful poacher named Gawdy, returning from the grave to kidnap and murder the infant heir of a Mr. Arthur Francis. Gawdy had been hanged for shooting a gamekeeper while poaching on Francis' land.

Television adaptation
"The Mezzotint" has been adapted for television as The Mezzotint,  written and directed by Mark Gatiss, as part of the A Ghost Story for Christmas series.  The drama was made by Can Do Productions and Adorable Media for BBC Television and was broadcast on Christmas Eve 2021. Filming was completed in February 2021.

As with most adaptations in the series, additional material was created which diverged from the story.  A subplot was added tying Mr. Williams’s family to the events depicted in the mezzotint, leading to the appearance of a gory apparition. The adaptation also added female characters, with a subplot involving a debate over whether or not the college should grant degrees to women.

References

External links

 
Full text of "The Mezzotint"
A Podcast to the Curious: Episode 3 - The Mezzotint

Short stories by M. R. James
Horror short stories
1904 short stories